Kadri Tali (born on 11 November 1966) is an Estonian botanist.

She has described at least one taxon: Neotinea ustulata var. aestivalis (Kümpel) Tali, M.F.Fay & R.M.Bateman, 2006.

References

Living people
1966 births
20th-century Estonian botanists
20th-century Estonian women scientists
21st-century Estonian women scientists
21st-century Estonian botanists